Bernard Albert Smallwood (22 December 1927 – 28 September 2017) was an Australian rules footballer who played for the Footscray Football Club in the Victorian Football League (VFL).

Notes

External links 
		

2017 deaths
1927 births
Australian rules footballers from Victoria (Australia)
Western Bulldogs players
Yarraville Football Club players